Mexican singer Flor Silvestre, one of the most iconic performers of Mexican and Hispanic music, is also a prolific and versatile actress of Mexican cinema's "golden age". In her 40-year acting career, she played leading and supporting roles in more than 70 feature films of various genres. She was one of the most sought-after actresses of the late 1950s, and, as a result, 30 of her films were released in only four years (1957-1960). She worked with film directors Zacarías Gómez Urquiza, Vicente Oroná, Miguel M. Delgado, Jaime Salvador, Chano Urueta, Roberto Gavaldón, Gilberto Martínez Solares, Miguel Contreras Torres, Rogelio A. González, Ismael Rodríguez, Gilberto Gazcón, Benito Alazraki, Miguel Zacarías, René Cardona, and Mario Hernández.

Filmography 

Actress filmographies
Mexican filmographies